Eveline Syme (26 October 1888 – 6 June 1961) was an Australian artist associated with the Grosvenor School of Modern Art, and an advocate for women's post-secondary education.

Early life
Eveline Winifred Syme was born in Thames Ditton, Surrey, England, daughter of Joseph Cowen Syme and Laura Blair Syme.  She was raised in Melbourne, where she was an early student of Melbourne Girls Grammar.  Her father was a newspaper publisher in that city, as were her grandfather Ebenezer Syme (proprietor of The Age), and William Spowers, the father of her friend and colleague, Ethel Spowers.  Eveline Syme returned to England to study classics at Newnham College, Cambridge, but women were not granted degrees from Cambridge in her time, so she went back to Melbourne to earn an education degree.

Career
Syme studied art in Paris with M. Denis at La Grand Chaumiere in 1922/1923  and Melbourne, often in the company of Spowers. She had her first solo show in Melbourne in 1925, and another in 1928, showing works in various media, many of them watercolor landscape studies, though she also painted in oils and drew in pencil. She and Spowers enrolled at the Grosvenor School of Modern Art in 1929, to learn more about linocuts.  They were joined here by Dorrit Black, studying linocut printing with Claude Flight. 

By the following year Syme was back in Melbourne, exhibiting and speaking about modern printmaking.  Along with Spowers she was associated with George Bell's "Contemporary Art Group."  Late in life, she was on the executive committee of the National Gallery Society of Victoria.

Syme was also involved in efforts during the 1930s to build a women's college at the University of Melbourne, and served as president of the University Women's College council in the 1940s.

Syme died in 1961, age 72. She was buried at Brighton Cemetery.  Eveline was a founding member of the University Women's College at the University of Melbourne. She left much of her estate to the University Women's College.

References

External links 
Eveline Winifred Syme [Australian art and artists file], State Library Victoria

1888 births
1961 deaths
Alumni of Newnham College, Cambridge
Artists from Melbourne
Australian printmakers
Australian women artists
People from Thames Ditton
Alumni of the Grosvenor School of Modern Art
Women printmakers
People educated at Melbourne Girls Grammar
19th-century Australian women
20th-century Australian women
English emigrants to Australia
Australian people of Scottish descent